Cedars-Sinai Medical Center is a nonprofit, tertiary, 886-bed teaching hospital and multi-specialty academic health science center located in Los Angeles, California. Part of the Cedars-Sinai Health System, the hospital employs a staff of over 2,000 physicians and 10,000 employees, supported by a team of 2,000 volunteers and more than 40 community groups. As of 2022-23, U.S. News & World Report ranked Cedars-Sinai the best hospital in the western United States. It ranked as the best hospital in California and 2nd best hospital in the entire United States; and was placed nationally in 11 adult medical specialties and rated high performing in 21 adult specialties, procedures and conditions. Cedars-Sinai is a teaching hospital affiliate of David Geffen School of Medicine at the University of California, Los Angeles (UCLA), which was ranked # 19 on the U.S. News 2023 Best Medical Schools: Research.

Cedars-Sinai focuses on biomedical research and technologically advanced medical education, based on an interdisciplinary collaboration between physicians and clinical researchers. The academic enterprise at Cedars-Sinai has research centers covering cardiovascular, genetics, gene therapy, gastroenterology, neuroscience, immunology, surgery, organ transplantation, stem cells, biomedical imaging, and cancer, with more than 500 clinical trials and 900 research projects currently underway (led by 230 principal investigators). The Graduate School of Biomedical Sciences at Cedars-Sinai offers a PhD Program in biomedical sciences and master's degree programs in magnetic resonance in medicine and health delivery science.

Certified as a level I trauma center for adults and pediatrics, Cedars-Sinai trauma-related services range from prevention to rehabilitation, and are provided in concert with the hospital's Department of Surgery. Named after the Cedars of Lebanon and Mount Sinai, Cedars-Sinai's patient care is depicted in the Jewish Contributions to Medicine mural located in the Harvey Morse Auditorium.

History

Cedars of Lebanon Hospital
Founded by Jewish businessman Kaspare Cohn, Cedars of Lebanon Hospital was established as the Kaspare Cohn Hospital in 1902. At the time, Cohn donated a two-story Victorian home at 1441 Carroll Avenue in the Angeleno Heights neighborhood of Los Angeles. The hospital had just 12 beds when it opened on September 21, 1902, and its services were initially free. From 1906 to 1910, Dr. Sarah Vasen, the first Jewish female doctor in Los Angeles, acted as superintendent. In 1910, the hospital relocated and expanded to Stephenson Avenue (now Whittier Boulevard), where it had 50 beds and a backhouse containing a 10-cot tubercular ward. It gradually transformed from a charity-based hospital to a general hospital and began to charge patients. In 1930, the hospital moved to 4833 Fountain Avenue, where it opened as Cedars of Lebanon Hospital, named after the religiously significant Lebanon cedars tree (Cedrus libani), which were highly sought after and used to build King Solomon's Temple in Jerusalem. Cedars of Lebanon Hospital could accommodate 279 patients and was large and comprehensive, with all of the components of a modern medical facility. For example, specific departments were instituted for general medicine, surgery, pediatrics, maternity, physical therapy, and other specialties.

Mount Sinai Hospital
Meanwhile, in 1918, the Bikur Cholim Society opened a two-room hospice, the Bikur Cholim Hospice, when the Great Influenza Pandemic hit the United States of America. In 1921, the hospice relocated to an eight-bed facility in Boyle Heights and was renamed Bikur Cholim Hospital. On November 7, 1926, it was renamed Mount Sinai Hospital and moved to a 50-bed facility on Bonnie Beach Place in Los Angeles. Later, in 1950, a new Mount Sinai Hospital was built on land donated by Emma and Hyman Levine at 8700 Beverly Boulevard. They had purchased 3.5 acres of land and donated the property to Mount Sinai Hospital under the auspices of their foundation.

Merger of Cedars of Lebanon Hospital and Mount Sinai Hospital

Cedars of Lebanon Hospital and Mount Sinai Hospital merged in 1961 to form Cedars-Sinai Medical Center. The unification of the two hospitals was one of the most significant consolidations ever achieved by hospitals; it was in response to community needs for improved and extended health services, made necessary by population growth and
modern medical progress. Donations in the amount of $4 million from the Max Factor Family Foundation allowed the construction of the main hospital building, which broke ground on November 5, 1972, and opened on April 3, 1976. The new hospital was designed jointly by Albert C. Martin & Associates and Charles Luckman Associates. The main contractor was Robert E. McKee, Inc. While the main hospital buildings were being built the Thalians Mental Health Center also designed by Martin and Luckman was being constructed. The main contractor was the Del E. Webb Corporation and the Thalians Center was completed in 1973.

In 1994, the Cedars-Sinai Health System was established, comprising the Cedars-Sinai Medical Care Foundation, the Burns and Allen Research Institute, and Cedars-Sinai Medical Center. The Burns and Allen Research Institute, named for George Burns and his wife, Gracie Allen, is located inside the Barbara and Marvin Davis Research Building. Opened in 1996, it houses biomedical research aimed at discovering genetic, molecular and immunological factors that trigger disease.

In 2006, Cedars-Sinai added the Saperstein Critical Care Tower with 150 ICU beds.

, Cedars-Sinai served 54,947 inpatients, 350,405 outpatients, and 77,964 visits to the emergency room. Cedars-Sinai received high rankings in 11 of the 16 specialties, ranking in the top 10 for digestive disorders and in the top 25 for five other specialties as listed below.

In 2013, Cedars-Sinai opened its 800,000-square-foot Advanced Health Sciences Pavilion, which consists of eight stories of program space located over a six-story parking structure, on the eastern edge of its campus at the corner of San Vicente Boulevard and Gracie Allen Drive. Designed by the architectural firm Hellmuth, Obata and Kassabaum, the pavilion brings patient care and translational research together in one site. The Advanced Health Sciences Pavilion houses the Cedars-Sinai's neurosciences programs, the Cedars-Sinai Heart Institute and Regenerative Medicine Institute laboratories, as well as outpatient surgery suites, an imaging area, and an education center.

Rankings
In 2022–23, US News ranked Cedars-Sinai the best hospital in California (beating UCLA Medical Center which topped in 2021-22 rankings), and 2nd best in the United States (only behind Mayo Clinic). Cedars-Sinai ranked as follows in adult medical specialties in the nationwide U.S. News Best Hospitals 2022–23 report:

Cedars-Sinai ranked as follows in the 2009 Los Angeles area residents' "Most Preferred Hospital for All Health Needs" ranking:

Worth magazine selected Cedars-Sinai Smidt Heart Institute as one of the United States' Top-25 Hospitals for Cardiac Bypass Surgery.

Cedars-Sinai's Gynecologic Oncology Division was named among the nation's Top 10 Clinical Centers of Excellence by Contemporary OB/GYN in 2009.

Research
Cedars-Sinai is one of the leading institutes for competitive research funding from the National Institutes of Health. As an international leader in biomedical research, it translates discoveries into successful treatments with global impact. Cedars-Sinai investigators pair basic scientific research in areas of stem cell biology, immunology, neuroscience and genetics, with clinical and translational discoveries, to continue advancing medical breakthroughs. Total research expenditure in 2020-21 was $252 million. In fiscal year 2021, Cedars-Sinai received $93 million in funding from the National Institutes of Health.

Some notable research areas and organized research units at Cedars-Sinai are:
 Artificial Intelligence in Medicine
 Biomanufacturing Center
 Biostatistics and Bioinformatics Research Center
 Cancer Research
 Center for Bioinformatics and Functional Genomics
 Center for Cardiac Arrest Prevention
 Center for Integrated Research in Cancer and Lifestyle
 Center for Neural Science and Medicine
 Center for Outcomes Research and Education
 Diabetes and Obesity Research
 Digestive Diseases Research 
 Division of Informatics
 Endocrinology Research
 Genetics and Genomics Research
 Heart Research
 Imaging Research
 Immunology and Infectious Diseases Research
 Medically Associated Science and Technology
 Neurosciences Research
 Pulmonary Research
 Regenerative Medicine Research
 Surgery Research
 Women's Health Research

Cedars-Sinai Graduate School of Biomedical Sciences

The Cedars-Sinai Graduate School of Biomedical Sciences (formerly known as the Cedars-Sinai's Graduate Research Education division), established in 2008, is a graduate college at Cedars-Sinai Medical Center. It offers PhD and Masters programs in Biomedical Sciences and healthcare fields.     There are more than 100 faculty, and over 150 enrollment; the Dean is Shlomo Melmed, MB, ChB, FRCP, MACP.

The school offers programs at the Masters and Doctoral levels. Didactic lectures are conducted at the Pacific Design Center while research is conducted at the medical center, specifically at the Burns and Allen Research Institute (named for George Burns and his wife, Gracie Allen), which is located inside the Barbara and Marvin Davis Research Building on Cedars-Sinai campus. Opened in 1996, it houses biomedical research aimed at discovering genetic, molecular and immunological factors that trigger disease. In 2013 new research labs were created, when Cedars-Sinai opened its 800,000-square-foot Advanced Health Sciences Pavilion, which consists of eight stories of program space located over a six-story parking structure, on the eastern edge of its campus at the corner of San Vicente Boulevard and Gracie Allen Drive. Designed by the architectural firm Hellmuth, Obata and Kassabaum, the pavilion brings patient care and translational research together in one site. The Advanced Health Sciences Pavilion houses the Cedars-Sinai's neurosciences programs, the Cedars-Sinai Heart Institute and Regenerative Medicine Institute laboratories, as well as outpatient surgery suites, an imaging area, and an education center.

PhD Program:
 Biomedical Sciences

Masters Programs
 Magnetic Resonance in Medicine
 Health Delivery Science

Professional Training Programs:
 Postdoctoral Scientist Program
 Clinical Scholars Program
 Research Internship Program

Notable staff
 Keith Black, Chair of the Department of Neurosurgery and Director of the Maxine Dunitz Neurosurgical Institute, has performed over 4,000 brain surgeries and has made significant medical advances relating to neurosurgery.
 Bruce Gewertz, Surgeon-in-Chief, Chair of the Department of Surgery, Vice-Dean for Academic Affairs and Vice-president for Interventional Services.
 Elsie Giorgi, former head of clinics
 David Ho was a resident at Cedars-Sinai when he encountered some of the first cases of what was later labeled AIDS.
 Verne Mason, internist and chairman of the Howard Hughes Medical Institute's  medical advisory committee. Mason gave the disease sickle cell anemia its name.
 David Rimoin, chair of Pediatrics for 18 years, specialized in genetics and was a pioneer researcher in dwarfism and skeletal dysplasia. Together with Michael Kaback, he discovered the enzyme screening for Tay-Sachs disease, reducing the incidence of the deadly disease by 90 percent.

 William Shell was a director of Cardiac Rehabilitation at Cedars-Sinai.
 Esther Somerfeld-Ziskind, a neurologist and psychiatrist who was chair of the Department of Psychiatry.
 Adam Springfield, who acted on the PBS series Wishbone, is now a Labor and Delivery scheduler.
 Jeremy Swan co-invented the pulmonary artery catheter together with William Ganz while at Cedars-Sinai.

Controversy
In 2008, state regulators found that Cedars-Sinai had placed the Quaid twins and others in immediate jeopardy by its improper handling of blood-thinning medication.

According to articles in the Los Angeles Times in 2009, Cedars-Sinai was under investigation for significant radiation overdoses of 206 patients during CT brain perfusion scans during an 18-month period. Since the initial investigation, it was found that GE sold several products to various medical centers with faulty radiation monitoring devices.

In 2011, Cedars-Sinai again created controversy by denying a liver transplant to medical marijuana patient Norman Smith. They removed Mr. Smith from a transplant waiting list for "non-compliance of our substance abuse contract", despite his own oncologist at Cedars-Sinai having recommended that he use the marijuana for his pain and chemotherapy. Dr. Steven D. Colquhoun, director of the Liver Transplant Program, said that the hospital "must consider issues of substance abuse seriously", but the transplant center did not seriously consider whether Mr. Smith was "using" marijuana versus "abusing" it. In 2012, Cedars-Sinai denied a liver transplant to a second patient, Toni Trujillo, after her Cedars-Sinai doctors knew and approved of her legal use of medical marijuana. In both cases, the patients acceded to the hospital's demand and stopped using medical marijuana, despite its therapeutic benefits for them, but were both sent back to the bottom of the transplant list. Smith's death inspired Americans for Safe Access to lobby for the California Medical Cannabis Organ Transplant Act (AB 258), which was enacted in July 2015 to protect future patients from dying at the hands of medical establishments prejudiced against the legal use of medical cannabis.

Patient data security breaches
On June 18 through June 24, 2013, six employees were terminated for inappropriately accessing 14 patient records around the time Kim Kardashian and Kanye West's daughter was born at the hospital. On June 23, 2014, an unencrypted employee laptop was stolen from an employee's home. The laptop contained patient Social Security numbers and patient health data.

Art collection
First developed by philanthropists Frederick and Marcia Weisman, Cedars-Sinai's modern and contemporary art collection dates to 1976 and includes more than 4,000 original paintings, sculptures, new media installations and limited-edition prints by the likes of Andy Warhol, Robert Rauschenberg, Richard Diebenkorn, Sam Francis, Claes Oldenburg, Willem de Kooning, Raymond Pettibon and Pablo Picasso. Ninety to 95 percent of the collection is on display at any given time. Nine large-scale works are located in courtyards, parking lots and public walkways throughout the approximately 30-acre campus. The collection consists entirely of gifts from donors, other institutions and occasionally the artists themselves.

There is a statue of Moses in the parking lot. However the two tablets of the covenant that, according to the story, Moses received at Mount Sinai, are blank on the statue.  This led many people to ask, "why is Moses in the parking lot?"  In response, the director of community engagement, Jonathan Schreiber, has given a brief lecture explaining the history of the statues role in the hospital merger.

Other
Film Producer Edward L. Montoro was hospitalized with an illness in May, 1984 shortly before his mysterious disappearance.

Actor Josh Hartnett was taken to the hospital via ambulance after suffering from gastrointestinal issues in April, 2009. He was discharged after five days. 

Rapper Kanye West was sent here after a near-fatal car crash in 2002. It is the inspiration for his song Through the Wire.

Actor/Musician Daniel Newman was involved a near-fatal hit and run incident in 2009.

Singer Travis Barker of Blink-182 was hospitalized in late June, 2022 due to pancreatic issues.

Comedian, actor, singer, game show host, announcer, spokesman, Ed McMahon had surgery on his broken back as well as neck surgery.

Rapper Biggie Smalls, also known as The Notorious B.I.G., was pronounced dead at Cedars-Sinai Medical Center on March 9, 1997, after being fatally shot in a drive-by shooting.

See also

References

External links

 Official Cedars-Sinai website
 Cedars-Sinai Medical Center - California Healthcare Atlas, California Office of Statewide Health Planning and Development
 
 

 
Hospital buildings completed in 1910
Hospital buildings completed in 1930
Hospitals established in 1961
Hospitals in Los Angeles
Jewish medical organizations
Teaching hospitals in California
Wilshire, Los Angeles
Westside (Los Angeles County)
Trauma centers
UCLA Health